Twice A Stranger: How Mass Expulsion Forged Modern Greece and Turkey (also published as Twice A Stranger: The Mass Expulsions that Forged Modern Greece and Turkey) is a book by Bruce Clark published in 2006 concerning the population exchange between Greece and Turkey which took place in the early 1920s, following the Treaty of Lausanne. 

As well as giving a detailed account of the background to the exchange, its implementation and immediate consequences, the author examines the continuing effects which it has had on the politics, culture and national identity of both the states concerned. He focuses particularly on the ambivalent feelings of the few surviving expellees and their descendants towards their former homelands.

Structure of the book 
Preface: Lausanne's children (pp. xi-xvii); 
In the preface, the author reflects on the phenomenon of nationalism as it manifested itself in these events and on parallels and contrasts with other later situations such as the Expulsion of Germans after World War II, the "Palestinian exodus" and the parallel Jewish exodus from Arab lands, the population movements in Bosnia in the 1990s and the ongoing situation in Northern Ireland.
 Introduction: A world torn asunder (pp. 1-19)
 Chapters

Publication details

Awards
The writer was awarded with the Runciman Prize for this book in 2007.

See also
Population exchange
Dissolution of the Ottoman Empire
Ethnic cleansing
Millet (Ottoman Empire)
Religious nationalism
Kemalist Ideology

External links
Book review in The New York Times
When worlds collide – review in The Guardian
Book review by the Council on Foreign Relations
Book review by Spyros Themelis

Deportation
Forced migration
Non-fiction books about immigration
History of the Republic of Turkey
History of modern Greece
Politics of the Ottoman Empire
Turkish War of Independence
Ethnic cleansing in Asia
Ethnic cleansing in Europe
History books about ethnic cleansing